The World is an album by U.S. Bombs.

Track listing 

 The World
 Goin' Out
 Yanks And Rebs
 Bombs Not Food
 Isolated Ones
 Skater Dater
 Hobroken Dreams
 Don't Take It Back
 New Approach
 Billy Club
 Checkpoint
 '76ixties
 Nothin' On Us
 Joe's Tune
 So In Fuck With You
 Salute The Dead
 Madagascar
 Not Enough

External links 

1999 albums
U.S. Bombs albums